Jakir Hossain Institute of Polytechnic is a private polytechnic college in Suti II, Aurangabad, Murshidabad district, West Bengal, India.

The Polytechnic is affiliated to the West Bengal State Council of Technical Education, and recognized by AICTE, New Delhi. The Polytechnic offers diploma courses in Computer Science & Technology (CST), Electronics & Telecommunication Engineering, Civil Engineering (CE), Electrical Engineering (EE), Mechanical Engineering (ME) and Science And Humanities.

References

External links
http://www.jakirhossainpolytechnic.com/

Universities and colleges in Murshidabad district
Technical universities and colleges in West Bengal
Educational institutions established in 2013
2013 establishments in West Bengal